The 2014 PGA Tour Canada season ran from May 29 to September 14 and consisted of 12 official tournaments. This was the 45th season of PGA Tour Canada (previously known as the Canadian Professional Golf Tour), and the second under the "PGA Tour Canada" name.

Schedule
The following table lists official events during the 2014 season.

Order of Merit
The Order of Merit was based on prize money won during the season, calculated in Canadian dollars. The top five players on the tour earned status to play on the 2015 Web.com Tour.

Notes

References

External links
PGA Tour Canada official site

PGA Tour Canada
PGA Tour Canada